Darzi Mahalleh (also Romanized as Darzī Maḩalleh) is a village in Babol Kenar Rural District, Babol Kenar District, Babol County, Mazandaran Province, Iran. In the 2006 census, its population was 405 with 104 families.

References 

Populated places in Babol County